Insinity is the third studio album by Brazilian hard rock band Dr. Sin, released in 1997.

Track listing

Personnel 
 Andria Busic – (Bass/Lead Vocals)
 Ivan Busic – (Drums/Backing Vocals)
 Eduardo Ardanuy – (Guitars)

Special guests 
Michael Vescera (ex-Yngwie Malmsteen and Loudness) on the track No Rules.
Jonathan Mover (Steve Vai) on the tack Insomnia (2nd drums).
Marcelo Souss on the Keyboards.
Silvio Luis on the track Futebol, Mulher e Rock n' Roll (Soccer, Woman and Rock N' Roll).

References

Dr. Sin albums
1997 albums